University of Paris 1 Panthéon-Sorbonne, also known as Paris 1 or Panthéon-Sorbonne University, is a public research university located in Paris, France. It was created in 1971 from two faculties of the historic University of Paris – colloquially referred to as the Sorbonne – after the May 1968 protests, which resulted in the division of one of the world's oldest universities. Most of the economics professors (35 out of 41) of the Faculty of Law and Economics of Paris preferred to found the multidisciplinary Paris 1 Panthéon-Sorbonne University with professors of the faculty of humanities of Paris and a few professors of law.

Panthéon-Sorbonne has three main domains: Economic and Management Sciences, Human Sciences, and Legal and Political Sciences; comprising several subjects such as: Economics, Law, Philosophy, Geography, Humanities, Cinema, Plastic arts, Art history, Political science, Mathematics, Management, and Social sciences.
 
Pantheon-Sorbonne's headquarters is located on the Place du Panthéon in the Latin Quarter, an area in the 5th and the 6th arrondissements of Paris. The university also occupies part of the historical Sorbonne campus. The current name of the university refers to these two symbolic buildings: the Sorbonne and the Panthéon (Saint-Jacques part). Overall, its campus includes over 25 buildings in Paris, such as the Centre Pierre Mendès France ("Tolbiac"), the Maison des Sciences Économiques, among others.

Panthéon-Sorbonne was globally ranked 287th (9th of France) in the 2021 QS World University Rankings and 601-800th (32nd of France) in the 2020 The Times Higher Education. It was also ranked by the 2019 QS Rankings by Subject as being 1st in France in Archaeology, History, Law, and Economics. In the French Eduniversal rankings, it is ranked 2nd of France in Economics and 2nd in Law.

History 

The historic University of Paris first appeared in the second half of the 12th century, but was reorganised in 1970 as 13 autonomous universities after the student protests of the French May. Following months of conflict between students and authorities at the University of Paris at Nanterre, the administration shut down that university on 2 May 1968. Students of the University of Paris protested the closure and the threatened expulsion of several students at Nanterre on 3 May 1968. After the student protests of May and June 1968, thirteen universities succeeded to the University of Paris (nicknamed "the Sorbonne"), which ceased to exist.

While Paris-Sorbonne University and Sorbonne Nouvelle succeeded the faculty of humanities of the University of Paris, Panthéon-Assas University the faculty of law, and Pierre and Marie Curie University and Paris Descartes University the faculty of sciences, Panthéon-Sorbonne University was founded as an interdisciplinary university. Indeed, most of the law professors of the faculty of law and economics of the University of Paris wished only to restructure their faculty into a university. However, most of the faculty's economists and political scientists, whose disciplines were secondary in the Faculty of Law of Paris, wanted to join a multidisciplinary university they hurried ahead of their colleagues and established Paris I and were joined by professors of the faculty of humanities and few professors of the faculty of law and economics. The name of the university show this interdisciplinarity: the Sorbonne building is the traditional seat of the Humanities studies in Paris (hence it is also used by Paris III and University Paris-Sorbonne), and the Panthéon building is, with the Assas building, the traditional seat of the law studies (hence it is also used by Panthéon-Assas University). The three official co-founders of the university were Henri Bartoli (Economy), Hélène Ahrweiler (Humanities) and François Luchaire (Law).

Campuses

Centre Sorbonne 

The centre Sorbonne houses multiple departments of university Panthéon-Sorbonne, including department of Management (Ecole de Management de la Sorbonne), History (Ecole d’histoire de la Sorbonne), Philosophy (UFR de Philosophie), Political Science (UFR de Science Politique) and part of the Economics and Law departments. It is one of the main campuses of the university.

Centre Pantheon 
The Center Pantheon, which should not be confused with the Pantheon itself, was the building of the Faculty of Law of the former Universisty of Paris and is located opposite the Pantheon. It was designed by Jacques-Germain Soufflot in 1760 as part of a new architectural ensemble for the Montagne Sainte-Geneviève. The Faculty of Law building was completed in 1744.

At the end of the 19th century, when the Sorbonne was undergoing major reforms, an extension was planned for the Panthéon building, designed by Louis-Ernest Lheureux. The extension took place in two phases, 1876-1878 and 1891-1899, and gave rise to the construction of a large new building connected to the 18th century facade. Together, they now occupied the entire city block. The construction of the Cujas wing, an 8-storey building on rue Cujas designed by the architect Jacques Becmeur, comprising a car park, an amphitheater and 4 floors of offices , is connected to the historic buildings by a monumental staircase which was later decorated by the students of the UFR d'Arts Plastiques. The main courtyard and the facades of the original building were listed as Historic Monuments in 1926.

The Panthéon center houses the Presidency of the University of Paris 1 Panthéon-Sorbonne.

Institute of Geography 
The Institute of Geography was built between 1914 and 1926 by Henri-Paul Nénot. The Institute was designed to bring together in a single building the collections, teaching and research in geography, hitherto divided between the faculties of arts and sciences. The building is connected to the neighboring Oceanographic Institute by a double arch to form the Curie campus.

The occupation of the Institute of Geography results from a decree of December 1, 1980, concerning joint ownership between the three universities Paris 1, Paris 4 (today Sorbonne University), Paris 7 (today University of Paris) and the Library interuniversity of the Sorbonne. Today, the building houses students of Geography department from 3rd year of Bachelor degree.

Institute of Art and Archeology (Centre Michelet) 
The Institute of Art and Archeology was built on the site of the former Institute of Applied Chemistry of the Faculty of Sciences by the architect Paul Bigot (1870-1942). The building offers in particular to the gaze of walkers, at the base of the large arcades, a frieze formed of terracotta bas-reliefs reproducing famous works of world art (Parthenon, Ara Pacis Augustae, etc.). The syncretism desired by Paul Bigot gives the Institute of Art and Archeology an educational virtue that resonates with the function of the building. Inside, the entrance vestibule, the amphitheater and the large reading room of the library, which occupies the heart of the building, have retained their volumes, but, on the floors, the galleries which housed the collections The heritage structures constituted in the Sorbonne and Paul Bigot's plan of Rome were abolished in the 1970s in favor of a partitioning of spaces into classrooms and teachers' offices, following the massification of higher education.

Initially designed for 200 students and 3 professors, the building now houses, equally, the art history and archeology departments of the two universities of Paris 1 Panthéon-Sorbonne and Sorbonne University (formerly Paris IV), several thousand students and nearly 150 tenured teacher-researchers.Property of the State, the Institute of Art and Archeology is assigned, by ministerial decree of June 30, 1983, in endowment to the two universities Paris 1 and Paris IV and registered in this form in the registers of the State. It has been classified as a Historic Monument since September 9, 1996.

Campus Port-Royal 
The brand new Campus Port-Royal is spread over two neighboring sites: the René-Cassin building located at 17 rue Saint-Hippolyte and, on the other side of the street, the former Lourcine barracks, which covers the entire block between boulevard de Port-Royal and rue de la Glacière, Broca and Saint-Hippolyte.

The René-Cassin site is made up of two buildings: a 19th century building acquired by the Ministry of National Education in 1957 and restructured in 1987, but above all a new building built between 1987 and 1990 by the architects Jacques Ripault and Denise Duhart.

The former Lourcine barracks, located at 37 boulevard Port-Royal, is one of the oldest military sites in Paris. Matured since 2011, the project to create a new law campus was entrusted in 2014 to the Public Establishment for University Development of the Ile de France region (EPAURIF) with a contracting authority mandate. The architectural challenge of the project was to preserve this heritage, testimony of the urban history of this district by touching it as little as possible, while developing it in an optimal way.

In addition to the three buildings on the Lourcine block, the current René-Cassin center has been attached to the new site to give birth to the Port-Royal Campus from the start of the 2019 academic year. This new center of Paris 1 Panthéon-Sorbonne allows, between others, the grouping of sites dedicated to legal disciplines. It welcomes students, teachers, researchers and staff in exceptional working conditions. More than 2,400 people now occupy this new campus.

Pierre Mendès-France Center 
In November 1970, Olivier Guichard, then Minister of National Education, decided to build a new university education center at the corner of rue de Tolbiac and rue de Baudricourt in the 13th arrondissement. In January 1971, the architects Michel Andraut and Pierre Parat were entrusted with the construction of the new building. The model of the project was presented by the architects on November 16, 1971. After two years of construction, the new university center opened its doors in the fall of 1973 under the name of "Multidisciplinary Center of Tolbiac".

Renamed in 1983 in honor of the French politician Pierre Mendès France, the Center Pierre-Mendès-France was built in the context of post-68 university programs and the urban renewal of the Italy XIII sector undertaken since 1964. The site – a cramped triangular plot of 7,500 m² hitherto occupied by a deposit of cobblestones – led to the original and ambitious choice of vertical development, which is quite unusual in terms of university architecture. The architects imagined a high-rise building (IGH) composed of three towers of unequal heights built around a central reinforced concrete core: tower A is nine stories high, tower B sixteen, and tower C of twenty-two. Andrault and Parat worked on the building in a quest for functionality and formal expressiveness which involves deconstructing the volumes, vigorously linking the lift towers ensuring vertical circulation in the building, "urban modules" which are these “suspended” cubic volumes sheltering the offices and the classrooms, and the amphitheatres which unfold in a corolla at the base of the building. This sculptural work is extended by a brutalist aesthetic based on the association of rough concrete, smoked glass, bricks, pebbles or even by the moving "landscape" imagined within the framework of the 1% artistic by Bernard Alleaume and Yvette Vincent-Alleaume at the base of the building to enliven the spaces overlooking rue de Tolbiac.

The Pierre-Mendès-France Center currently welcomes around 6,000 first and second year undergraduate students in human sciences, economics and management.
 Tolbiac Center : a secondary building of the Mendès-France Center (which confusingly is also called Tolbiac).

There are other campuses of Paris 1 in the Parisian areas :

 Albert Châtelet Center : commonly called Calvin, it is a secondary building of the Sorbonne.
 Rue d'Ulm Center : like Calvin, a secondary building of the Sorbonne.
 Institute of Philosophy of Sciences and Techniques (IHPST) : located in the Rue du Four.
 Mahler Center : located in the 4th arrondissement, it houses an historical and legal studies institute.
 Saint-Charles Center : located in the 15th arrondissement. Founded in 1973, it houses the Art School and the School of Cinema.
 Economical Studies Building : located in the 13th arrondissement. It houses the Economics Graduate School.
 Broca Center : Located in the 5th arrondissement. It houses the Business School.
 International Building : located in the Boulevard Arago, commonly called Arago. It houses the International Relations Institute.
 Fontenay Center : located in the suburban town of Fontenay-aux-Roses, in the old buildings of the École Normale Supérieure. It houses the School of Work Social Sciences.
 Sceaux Center : in the suburban town of Sceaux, it is a secondary building of the Fontenay Center.
 Bourg-la-Reine Center : located in Bourg-la-Reine, it is a secondary building of the Fontenay Center.
 Nogent Center : located in Nogent-sur-Marne, it is a secondary building of the Fontenay Center.

Organisation and administration

Departments

Sorbonne School of History 
Teaching and research are spread over several sites in Paris: on the left bank, in the Latin Quarter (Sorbonne, Panthéon, Centre rue du Four) and in the Pierre Mendès France Centre (Tolbiac); on the right bank (Institut National d'Histoire de l'Art, Centre rue Malher, and Campus Condorcet on the Aubervilliers site, and in 2024 on the La Chapelle site). The School has 17 specialized libraries, among the richest in the world in their scientific fields, for books and document collections and for access to digital holdings.  The Bibliothèque Interuniversitaire de la Sorbonne (BIS) is an additional resource.

Sorbonne School of Arts
The Sorbonne School of Arts (École des arts de la Sorbonne) is the unit of Training and Research in Plastic Arts and Art Sciences (UFR 04) of the University of Paris 1 Panthéon-Sorbonne, teaches art through its most contemporary issues, through practice, but also the analysis of works and their mediation.The school offers a variety of courses ranging from Visual Arts, Cinema and Audiovisual, to Cinema/Management, as well as Aesthetics and Art Sciences, Design, Arts and Media, Arts and Culture and a Preparatory Course for the Teaching Profession (PPPE) specialized in Plastic Arts.

Located in the heart of the 15th arrondissement, at 47 rue des Bergers, in a building of more than 7000 square meters entirely dedicated to it - the Saint Charles Center - the EAS welcomes nearly 3000 students. It has a university library specifically dedicated to art and creation, an amphitheater, a contemporary art gallery, classrooms for theoretical courses, workshops for artistic practices (sculpture, painting, ceramics, silk-screen printing, engraving, a silver and digital photography laboratory, a Fab Lab... ), an office for the loan of audiovisual material, computer rooms, editing rooms, etc. .

Sorbonne Law School

Panthéon-Sorbonne united in 2009 all legal studies in the university and gave that new department the name of École de droit de la Sorbonne ("Sorbonne Law School").

The Sorbonne Law School holds since 1993 with Cornell University, the "Cornell Law School-Université Paris I Panthéon-Sorbonne Summer Institute of Comparative and International Law".

Since March 7, 2022, Mrs. Chantal Arens, First President of the Court of Cassation signed a partnership agreement between the Court of Cassation and the University of Paris 1 Panthéon Sorbonne. This partnership will result in the organization of colloquiums, the development of research projects involving judges of the Court of Cassation and will allow the hosting of student interns within the Court.

Sorbonne School of Economics 
The Sorbonne School of Economics (EES, formerly UFR02 - Economics) was created in 1971.

Other 

 Sorbonne School of Management
 Geography
 Philosophy
 Political Science
 Applied Mathematics and Computer Science

Institutes 
 Sorbonne Graduate Business School
 Institute for the Study of Economic and Social Development (IEDES)
 Paris Demography Institute (IDUP)
 Institute for Research and Advanced Studies in Tourism (IREST)
 Institute of Labour Studies (ISST)
 Institute of Philosophy of Sciences and Techniques (IHPST)
 Institute for War and Peace Studies
 Institute of Juridical and Philosophical Sciences (ISJPS)

Sorbonne Publishing 
Sorbonne Publishing (Editions de la Sorbonne) is a publishing house of the Panthéon-Sorbonne University.

It has published over 700 books since 1971 and publishes approximately 50 new titles a year.

Academics

Undergraduate admission 
The University of Paris 1 Panthéon-Sorbonne receives the most applications, with more than 113,000 applicants for only 6,164 places. More than 22.84% of students accepted by the university having received highest honors ("mention très bien") in high school during the 2019 session (first of France).

In Law, in 2021, the rate of "with honors" and "with highest honors" mentions among the admitted students reached a high of 91% (second of France, after Panthéon-Assas).

Teaching and learning

Research 

Every year around 400 PhD theses are defended and 1,700 pre-PhD post-graduate degrees are awarded in 74 subjects divided between 15 graduate schools.

Documentary resource centers 

In Economics, the library at the Centre Pierre Mendès France offers students free access to its large collection.

In Law, the Cujas Library, co-administered with Panthéon-Assas, with its computerized documentation service, provides access to over 500 data banks and is the largest law and economics library in France.

In Humanities, The Sorbonne library, a common library of Panthéon-Sorbonne University, Sorbonne-Nouvelle University, Sorbonne University, Paris Descartes University, and Paris Diderot University. It is administered by Panthéon-Sorbonne University as per a governing agreement signed among these universities in 2000. It has a collection of almost three million books, 100,000 of which are more than 200 years old, and 17,500 periodicals covering all the humanities. The library and map collection of the Geography Institute are the oldest such collection in France. In addition, the 400,000 volumes in the specialist libraries offer users one of the largest collections in France and Europe.

International 
Panthéon-Sorbonne has signed over 150 conventions with foreign universities across five continents. These exchanges revolve around international networks such as Europaeum which bring together Oxford, London, Bologna, Bonn, Geneva, Helsinki, Leiden and Prague. The University of Paris I also heads a number of consortia which bring together French universities and professional organisations. The consortia are responsible for major international projects in Bucharest, Buenos Aires, Cairo, Istanbul (Galatasaray), and Moscow.

Every year some 130 academics from foreign universities come to teach and do research at the University of Paris I. Many researchers and members of faculty take part in major international research programs abroad; the University also hosts many annual international conferences. Six thousand international students, mainly from Europe, come to study as part of the SOCRATES or TEMPUS programmes. African students are joined by increasing numbers from Asia and America, and take part in specific programs organised in conjunction with universities across the world.

Dual and double degree programs 
At Panthéon-Sorbonne, students can apply for admission to one of the dual degree or double degree programs designed in conjunction with partner universities in France and abroad. Double degree programs confer two degrees to students, whereas dual degrees confer a degree from the host university only.

Rankings

International rankings 

In 2021, Pantheon-Sorbonne was globally ranked 287th (9th of France) by QS World University Rankings and 601-800th (32nd of France) by The Times Higher Education. It does not currently appear in the latest US News ranking of world universities. Regarding world reputation, it was ranked 101-125th in The Times Higher Education World Reputation Rankings of 2021.

By area or subject, it was ranked:

 In the 2021 QS World University Rankings
 Arts and Humanities: 31st (1st in France)
 Classics & Ancient History: 12th (2nd in France)
 Archaeology: 25th (1st in France)
 Philosophy: 27th (2nd in France)
 History: 33th (1st in France)
 Geography: 35th (1st in France)
 Modern Languages: 67th ( 3rd in France)
 Art & Design: 101st-150th (4th in France)
 Architecture & Built Environment: 151st-200th (1st in France)
 Social Sciences: 62st (4th in France)
 Law: 20th (1st in France)
 Development Studies: 37th (1st in France)
 Economics & Econometrics: 80h (3nd in France)
 Politics & International Studies: 51st-100th (2nd in France)
 Anthropology: 51st-100th (1st in France, tied)
 Social Policy & Administration: 101st-120th (2nd in France)
 Accounting & Finance: 101st-150th (5th in France, tied)
 Business & Management studies: 101st-150th (7th in France, tied)
 In the 2022 Times Higher Education:
 Arts and Humanities: 47th (2rd in France)
 Law: 48th (1st in France)
 Social Sciences: 251-300 (6th in France)
 Business and Economics: 251-300 (6th in France)

National rankings 

Economics and business

In Economics, its undergraduate program is ranked second of the French universities by Eduniversal. Its masters programs are ranked 4th of the French Universities or academic institution by Eduniversal.

In Business, Panthéon-Sorbonne is ranked 14 by Eduniversal, second of the universities, behind Paris Dauphine University.

Law

Panthéon-Sorbonne law programs are globally ranked second by Eduniversal.

Panthéon-Sorbonne undergraduate law program are ranked as follow:
 Law: 2nd
 Law and Economics: 2nd
 Law and English: 2nd

Graduate programs are ranked as follow: 
 Social Law: 2nd and 3rd
 Digital Law : 3rd
 Tax law: 5th

In terms of salary, Panthéon-Sorbonne law graduates are ranked second in France.

Humanities

No national ranking exists in Humanities.

Controversies

Tolbiac blockades 

The Tolbiac center of Paris 1, which previously hosted the undergraduate lectures in law, is regularly subject to blockades, which cause cancellation of all lectures up to several months, including in 1995, 1997, 2006, 2007–09, 2010 and 2018.

Attempts of automatic pass for students 
Student unions regularly demand that the university grant student an automatic pass, in particular at each blockade or strike. In 2020, during the covid crisis, the committee at Paris I in charge of exams decided to grant that right (i.e. to cancel marks under 10), but some professors asked the courts to cancel this decision A first court validated the decision of the committee, but a second one cancelled its decision.

People
This list includes notable people affiliated with the Pantheon-Sorbonne University. For people affiliated with the University of Paris which ceased to exist in 1970, see List of University of Paris people.

Notable academics 
 Michèle Alliot-Marie: State doctorate in political science, former director of the Faculty of Political Science, former Minister (Defense, Interior, Justice and Foreign Affairs) and former UMP MP in the National Assembly.
 Jeannette Bougrab, Associate Professor of Law
 Christian de Boissieu, Professor of Economics
 Jane Freedman, former Marie Curie Professor of Politics and International Relations
 Jean-Claude Colliard, director of the Department of Political Science
 Jean-Pierre Cot, Professor of international law
 Alpha Condé, professor emeritus of law, former President of Guinea
 Olga Kisseleva, Professor of Art, founder of Art & Science program of the Sorbonne
 Josepha Laroche, Professor of political science
 Louis Lévy-Garboua, Professor of Behavioral Economics
 Daniel Roche, historian
 Michel Serres, philosopher
 Nicolas Warembourg, Professor of Law

Notable alumni
Sergio de Mello: former UN High Commissioner for Human Rights
Yves-Marie Adeline: PhD in Arts and art writer
 Samir Assaf: DEA Money Finance Bank, CEO of HSBC Global Banking & Markets
 Maurice Benayoun: PhD in Arts and Art Sciences, international artist, Professor at City University of Hong Kong.
 Christian de Boissieu: doctor in economics, professor and director of the Council of Economic Analysis
 Ali Bongo Ondimba: President of Gabon, the son of former President Omar Bongo and the Minister of Defence from 1999 to 2009.
 Jean-Louis Borloo: former minister, LLB
Rosi Braidotti, contemporary philosopher and feminist theoretician, distinguished Professor in the Humanities at University of Utrecht
 Jorge Castañeda: Professor at New York University and former Foreign Minister of Mexico.
 Luc Chatel: Master of Science in Management, Master of Marketing, Secretary of State for Consumer Affairs and Tourism to the Minister of Economy, Finance and Employment and spokesman for the UMP, former Minister of National Education
 Alpha Condé: politician and current President of the Republic of Guinea.
 Régis Debray: ENS, Doctor of Philosophy
 Thierry Derez: CEO Covéa
 Harlem Désir: degree in philosophy, now MEP
 Hazem El Beblawi: Former Prime Minister of Egypt
 Myriam El Khomri: Masters in Political Sciences, former Minister of Labour
 Abdullah Ensour: Former Prime Minister of the Hashemite Kingdom of Jordan
 Taieb Fassi Fihri: Moroccan Minister of Foreign Affairs and Cooperation.
 Sylvie Faucheux, president of the University of Versailles-Saint-Quentin-en-Yvelines.
 Laurence Ferrari: Master of political and social communication, journalist
 Olivia Fox Cabane: Author, business consultant and public speaker
 Jean Claude Gandur, former Chairman and CEO of Addax Petroleum
 Irakli Garibashvili: Prime Minister of Georgia
 Shaul Gordon: Canadian-Israeli Olympic sabre fencer
 Théodore Holo: President of the High Court of Justice of Benin and former Minister
 Chantal Jouanno: Minister of Youth and Sports, control of economic and social administration
 Franck Julien, president of the TFN
 Giorgos Kaminis: Mayor of the capital of Greece (Athens) and Greek Ombudsman from April 2003 until September 2010.
 Andreas Kaplan, economist
 Olga Kisseleva: PhD in Arts and Art Sciences, international artist, Professor at the Sorbonne Art School.
 Fabrizio Marrella: PhD in International Law, Full Professor of International Law (Venice and Rome, Italy). Arbitrator and Counsel. Honorary Dean HRV of the European Inter-University Center for Human Rights.
 Ibrahim Hassane Mayaki: PhD in public law, politician, former Prime Minister of Niger
 Arnaud Montebourg: LLB, French Minister of Industrial Renewal
 André Mba Obame: former interior minister in Gabon, losing the presidential election in 2009
 Daniel Ona Ondo PhD in Economics, academic and politician Gabon
 Renganaden Padayachy:  Ph.D. in Economics, Minister of Finance (Mauritius)
 Vincent Peillon: Bachelor, CAPES, aggregation and doctorate in philosophy. Former MEP, former member of the Somme and the current Minister of National Education.
 Corine Pelluchon: philosopher and professor 
Emmanuelle Polack, art historian, provenance researcher, director of research at the Musée du Louvre.
 Yazid Sabeg: CS executive and communication systems, and Commissioner for Diversity and Equal Opportunities since 17 December 2008
 Maristela Salvatori: Award-winning Brazilian printmaker
 Manal Abdel Samad: Lebane politician and former Minister of Information
 Alexander Stubb: Former Prime Minister of Finland
 William Sweet: DEA in Political Sciences, philosopher, member of the Royal Society of Canada.
 Jean-Pierre Thiollet: Writer
 Jean-Marc Lofficier: Writer, publisher
 Manuel Valls: Degree in History. Mayor of Évry, Essonne and former Prime minister
 Laurent Wauquiez: Masters in History, former Minister of Higher Education and Research
 Alfredo Tjiurimo Hengari: PhD in Politics, Namibian Special Advisor (on Media) to President Hage Geingob.
Miloš Jovanović: Serbian political scientist and a politician, president of the Democratic Party of Serbia.

See also
 Higher education in France

References

Sources

External links
 Official website

Universities in Paris
Buildings and structures in the 5th arrondissement of Paris
Educational institutions established in 1971
1971 establishments in France
Universities descended from the University of Paris